Joann Stock is a professor at California Institute of Technology known for her research into plate tectonics, particularly on changes in plate boundaries over geological time.

Education and career 
Stock earned her B.S. from Massachusetts Institute of Technology in 1981, and went on college field trip to Greece which grabbed her interest in geology. She "liked learning things that nobody knew before" and was particularly interested in earthquakes on the sea floor. She went on to earn an M.S. (1981) and a Ph.D. from Massachusetts Institute of Technology (1988). From 1988 until 1992 she was on the Geology and Geophysics faculty at Harvard University, and then she moved to the California Institute of Technology where she was promoted to professor in 1998. From 1995 until 2000 she was also an adjunct investigator at the Centro de Investigación Científica y de Educación Superior de Ensenada.

Research 

Stock is known for her research into plate tectonics, especially the uncertainties associated with determining the location of tectonic plates in the past. Through her collaboration with Peter Molnar, Stock has examined the movement of plates in the Cenozoic and in the period since the Late Cretaceous. Stock has also defined the positions of tectonic plates in the Late Cretaceous and the Paleogene. Her work includes a reconstruction of the interactions between the Pacific plate and the North America plates, and a description of the transfer of Baja California to the North American Plate. Stock's work also addresses how mantle hot spots begin and variability in the position of hot spots.

Selected publications

Awards and honors 
Guggenheim Fellowship (2004)
Presidential Young Investigator Award (1990-1995)
Fellow, Geological Society of America (2009)
Fellow, American Geophysical Union (2010)

References 

Fellows of the American Geophysical Union
Massachusetts Institute of Technology alumni
California Institute of Technology faculty
Women geologists
Volcanologists
Geophysicists
1959 births
Living people